Acanthocalycium thionanthum subsp. ferrarii is a subspecies of Acanthocalycium from Argentina. It can grow to up to 12 centimeters in diameter and produces red, orange, or yellow flowers.

References

External links
 
 

thionanthum subsp. ferrarii
Flora of Argentina